Arsen Julius Darnay (born July 31, 1936 in Budapest) is a Hungarian-American science fiction writer.

Darnay emigrated to the United States in 1953. His first science fiction stories were published in Galaxy Science Fiction in 1974–75, after being purchased by editor Jim Baen; Mike Ashley has estimated that of all Baen's discoveries, Darnay was "the most prolific (...) at least for the next four years before he moved on to become a management consultant."

Critical reaction
In 1976, Darnay was a finalist for the John W. Campbell Award for Best New Writer. His works were twice finalists for the Locus Award for Best Novella.

Kirkus Reviews described Darnay as a "diamond in the rough".

References

External links
Darnay's blog
Darnay's autobiography, at the ISFDB
The Atomic Priesthood and Nuclear Waste Management - Religion, Sci-fi Literature and the End of our Civilization

American science fiction writers
Hungarian emigrants to the United States
1936 births
Living people
Writers from Budapest
American male novelists